The RA Class are diesel locomotives built by English Electric, Rocklea for the Western Australian Government Railways between 1969 and 1972. They were a revised version of the R class.

Description
The RA class were a hood type general purpose diesel-electric locomotive. They were similar to the Queensland Railways 1300 class. All equipment, except traction motors, were interchangeable with the standard gauge K class. The main differences with the R class were a slight increase in length and wheelbase and deletion of the dynamic brake. They were otherwise identical mechanically and electrically.

The bogies were identical to those fitted to the R class and were an English Electric design with low weight transfer characteristics. They feature fully equalised primary spring gear, all traction motors in each bogie mounted with the nose-suspension facing inwards, traction thrust at near axle level and long pivot centres to reduce inter-bogie transfer. Adhesion loss at maximum tractive effort is limited to 4.5 per cent allowing  trailing load to be hauled up a 1 in 100 grade.

History
Following on from the R class, a further 11 were ordered, but without dynamic brakes. A further two were financed by the Lefroy Salt Company for use over a  spur off the Esperance line.

In 1973, a version of the RA class with a low nose was ordered for Tasmanian Government Railways, which classed them Z.

In 1974 the RA1914, RA1917 and RA1918 were fitted with standard gauge bogies and renumbered KA211-KA213. RA1918 has been preserved by Rail Heritage WA.

Class list

References

Co-Co locomotives
English Electric locomotives
Diesel locomotives of Western Australia
Railway locomotives introduced in 1969
3 ft 6 in gauge locomotives of Australia
Standard gauge locomotives of Australia
Diesel-electric locomotives of Australia